Unione Sportiva Pro Victoria Pallavolo, also known as Vero Volley Milano, is the volleyball department of Italian sports club  and is based in Monza. It has male and female teams and is better known for its women's team which currently plays in the Serie A1.

Previous names
Due to sponsorship, the club have competed under the following names:
 Pro Victoria Pallavolo (1981–2008)
 Saugella Team Monza (2008–2017)
 Vero Volley Monza (2018-2021)
 Vero Volley Milano (2022-present)

History

Early years
Unione Sportiva Pro Victoria volleyball department was created in 1981 to provide the local community with a regular and organized sports activity. In few years the club becomes more professionally structured with the men's team playing in the regional league and the creation of a women's team. When the men's team reached the national Serie B, the club lack of economic resources to remain professional forced it to focus on the youth teams. In 2002 the club created a technical department providing better support for its teams.

Vero Volley
On 9 September 2008, Pro Victoria Pallavolo was one of the seven volleyball clubs from the Lombardy region which formed a consortium called Vero Volley based in Monza. The consortium was designed to provide supporting structure to its members through organisational strategies to offer the region physical activity and sport socialization, with focus on young people.

Pro Victoria teams grew and developed under the consortium, when the men's team gained promotion to Serie A2 in 2010, Pro Victoria sold its professional men's team assets and licence to Volley Milano, another member of the Vero Volley consortium. That allowed Pro Victoria to focus on the women's team and youth teams (men and women). In 2013 the women's team was promoted to Serie A2, eventually reaching the Serie A1 in 2016.

Team
The following is the roster for the 2022–2023 season.''

Honours

National competitions

International competitions
  CEV Challenge Cup: 1
2019
  CEV Cup: 1
2021

References

External links

 Vero Volley official website  - Professional team info
 Official website  - Youth teams info

Italian women's volleyball clubs
Volleyball clubs established in 1981
1981 establishments in Italy
Sport in Monza
Serie A1 (women's volleyball) clubs